Källingemöre is a village on the island Öland in Sweden. It belongs to the municipality Borgholm.

Populated places in Borgholm Municipality